Aleki Lutui (born 1 July 1978) in Tofoa, Tonga, is a Tongan rugby union international player. His position is hooker.  He is currently playing club rugby for Ampthill in RFU Championship.

He previously played for Chiefs in the international Super 14 competition, as well as the Bay of Plenty in the Air New Zealand Cup. He was also the top try scorer for the Bay of Plenty in the 2002 National Provincial Championship (now, the Air New Zealand Cup).

He has appeared numerous times for his national team Tonga. He made his debut for Tonga in March 1999 in a match against Georgia.

He played for Tonga in their 2001 Pacific Rim campaign and later in the year toured Scotland and Wales. On June 5, 2004 he captained Tonga for the first time in a match against Fiji. In June 2005 he captained Tonga in four matches; two against both Fiji and Samoa.

He went on tour with the Pacific Islanders rugby union team in 2004 for a series of Tests against a number of southern rugby nations. He was included in the Pacific Nations tour to Europe in late 2006 and also played in the game against England at Twickenham in 2008.

Lutui joined Worcester in September 2006 on a two-year deal. The Tongan international was a former police officer before he took up rugby.

He has been a key figure for previous clubs in Super 14. He has since become an important player Sixways with his all-action displays and eye for the try line.

Lutui, a powerful ball carrier and hitter, was named in the Tonga squad for the 2007 Rugby World Cup in France, the 2011 Rugby World Cup in New Zealand and the 2015 Rugby World Cup in England.

On the 24 April 2013, Lutui signed a two-year deal which will bring him to Edinburgh Rugby in the Pro12.

However, on 20 June 2014, Lutui left Edinburgh to return to the Premiership to join Gloucester Rugby for next season's campaign.

For the 2015-16 season, Lutui signed for Ampthill playing in National League 1, joining a strong contingent of Tongan players.

External links
Gloucester profile
Worcester Warriors Profile at Worcester Warriors Profile
Pacific Islanders Profile on PacificIslanders.co.nz

References

1978 births
Living people
Pacific Islanders rugby union players
People from Haʻapai
Rugby union hookers
Tonga international rugby union players
Tongan police officers
Tongan rugby union players
Bay of Plenty rugby union players
Worcester Warriors players
Gloucester Rugby players
Edinburgh Rugby players
Chiefs (rugby union) players
Tongan expatriate rugby union players
Expatriate rugby union players in England
Expatriate rugby union players in New Zealand
Tongan expatriate sportspeople in New Zealand
Tongan expatriate sportspeople in England
Sportspeople from Gloucestershire
Ampthill RUFC players